Barão Vermelho 2 is the second album by Brazilian rock band Barão Vermelho, released in 1984.  It includes their first hit "Pro Dia Nascer Feliz", which became one of the band's classics.

Track listing 
 "Intro/ Menina Mimada" (Intro/Spoiled Girl)
 "O Que a Gente Quiser" (Whatever We Want)
 "Vem Comigo" (Come With Me)
 "Bicho Humano" (Human Bug)
 "Largado no Mundo" (Dropped in the World)
 "Carne de Pescoço" (Roughneck Meat)
 "Pro Dia Nascer Feliz" (rough translation: "Happy at Daybreak")
 "Manhã Sem Sono" (Sleepless Morning)
 "Carente Profissional" (rough translation: "Professionally Needy")
 "Blues do Iniciante" (Beginner's Blues)

Personnel
 Cazuza: lead vocals
 Roberto Frejat: guitar
 Maurício Barros: keyboards
 Dé: bass
 Guto Goffi: drums and percussion

Som Livre albums
Barão Vermelho albums
1983 albums